Santana Latin American Tour 2005 was a Latin American concert tour by American rock band Santana in 2005.

Tour band 
 Andy Vargas – lead vocals
 Carlos Santana – lead guitar, percussion, vocals
 Tommy Anthony – rhythm guitar
 Chester D. Thompson – keyboards, vocals
 Salvador Santana – keyboards
 Benny Rietveld – bass guitar
 Dennis Chambers – drums
 William Ortiz – trumpet
 Jeff Cresman – trombone
 Bobby Allende – percussion, vocals
 Karl Perazzo – timbales, percussion, vocals

Set list 
This set list is representative of the show on April 10. It does not represent all concerts for the duration of the tour.

 "Jin-go-lo-ba" (Babatunde Olatunji)
 "Roule" (Carlos Santana, S. Jurad)
 "Put Your Lights On" (Erik Schrody)
 "Aye Aye Aye"	(Michael Shrieve, Santana, Karl Perazzo, Raul Rekow)
 "Concierto de Aranjuez" (Joaquín Rodrigo)
 "Maria Maria" (Santana, Perazzo, Rekow, Wyclef Jean, Jerry Duplessis)
 "Foo Foo" (Yvon André, Roger Eugène, Yves Joseph, Hermann Nau, Claude Jean)
 "Samba Pa Ti" (Santana)
 "Batuka" (José Areas, David Brown, Michael Carabello, Gregg Rolie, Michael Shrieve)
 "No One to Depend On" (Carabello, Coke Escovedo, Rolie, Willie Bobo, Melvin Lastie)
 "El Fuego" (Santana, Jean Shepherd, Richard Shepherd)
 "Make Somebody Happy" (Santana, Alex Ligertwood)
 "Spiritual" (John Coltrane)
 "(Da Le) Yaleo" (Santana, Shakara Mutela, Christian Polloni)
 "Black Magic Woman" (Peter Green)
 "Gypsy Queen" (Gábor Szabó)
 "Oye Como Va" (Tito Puente)
Encore
 "Apache" (Jerry Lordan)
 "Smooth" (Itaal Shur, Rob Thomas)
 "Dame Tu Amor" (Abraham Quintanilla, Ricky Vela, Richard Brooks)
 "Corazón Espinado" (Fher Olvera)
 "Evil Ways" (Clarence "Sonny" Henry)
 "A Love Supreme" (John Coltrane)

Tour dates

Box office score data

References

External links 
 Santana Past Shows 2005 at Santana official website

Santana (band) concert tours
2005 concert tours
Concert tours of North America